Wolińska Kępa, commonly known as Ostrów, and until 1945 as Plage Wiese, is an island on the Dziwna channel in the Kamień County, West Pomeranian Voivodeship, Poland. It lies within the boundaries of town of Wolin, between island of Wolin and mainland with the town of Recław on the coast. Length of the island is 0.7 km (0.41 mi) and width, 0.25 km (0.155 mi).

Buildings and infrastructure 
On the islands is located open-air museum operated by Slavs and Vikings Centre. It has a buildings referring to the architecture of early Medieval Vikings and Slavs. It is surrounded by the defensive walls and fragments of the palisade with the gate and tower. Through the island goes Zamkowa Street. It is connected with island of Wolin by one bridge, while with mainland by two. Norther part of the island, from the Zamkowa Street, is an area of bird protected area registered as Szczecin Lagoon as a pert of Natura 2000 initiative.

Culture 
Every year, in the first week of August, on the island is organised the Slavs and Vikings Festival in the open-air museum.

References 

Geography of West Pomeranian Voivodeship
Islands of Poland
Baltic islands